Eye on It is the sixth studio album by TobyMac,  released on August 28, 2012. A deluxe version of the album was also released. The album experiments more with electronic music, primarily dubstep. "Me Without You" was released as the first single from the album on June 12, 2012. The album won Best Contemporary Christian Music Album at the 2013 Grammy Awards.

Critical reception

Eye on It received mostly positive reviews from critics. Kim Jones of About.com rated the album four out of five stars, praising TobyMac's ability to provide fresh new music while staying true to his Christian base. Also, AllMusic's James Christopher Monger rated the album four out of five, calling the tracks the most accessible collection by TobyMac to date. Robert Ham of Christianity Today rated the album four out of five and listed "Favorite Song", "UnStoppable", and "Eye on It" as the top tracks, but said that "if there's any detriment to the album, it is that the singer and his collaborators are a little too enthusiastic about tossing every idea and interlude into these songs." In addition, Matt Conner  of CCM Magazine gave it the same rating, with saying that "TobyMac keeps things fun and light, summery vibe throughout." New Release Tuesday's Sarah Fine gave the album 4.5 out of five stars, saying that "2012's Eye on It has taken shape not only as one of Toby’s most musically whimsical projects, but one of his most passionate." Likewise, Jono Davies of Louder Than the Music gave the album the same rating, and told that "With this album you will find yourself dancing, thinking, crying and dreaming, but especially dancing." Cross Rhythms' Tony Cummings gave it a similar rating, with a nine-out-of-ten, and he wrote that he was "certain there are tracks here that will connect – musically and spiritually – with people wherever they are heard, and with radio stations around the world guaranteed to play 'Eye On It' that's a lot of people." Tyler Hess of Christian Music Zine gave the album a 4.25-out-of-a-five, and called the album a "top notch production." Finally, George Welsted of Christian Music Review gave the album a perfect five and called it "Masterfully Composed and Fresh".

However, some critics were less favorable. Jesus Freak Hideout gave the album three-point-five out of five in both reviews, with Roger Gelwicks writing that "Despite its weaknesses, Eye on It is a testament to good old-fashioned musicianship that gives credit to Whom it is due; the mark of an endearing album, no matter what the genre or time." Indie Vision Music's Jonathan Andre rated the album three out of five, but praised TobyMac's ability to continually reinvent himself and speak to young people everywhere. Calvin Moore of The Christian Manifesto, however, was highly negative, rating the album one-point-five out of five. The reviewer, Calvin Moore, stated that "While this project isn't everything that is wrong with Christian pop music, it is that saccharine, surface-level mediocre sound that appeals to far too many Christians. With a few exceptions, this endeavor is wholly forgettable." Moore did find reason to praise "Lose Myself", feeling that it is the one track "showcases Toby Mac doing what he does well."

Commercial performance
The album debuted at No. 1 on the Billboard 200 chart selling 69,000 copies in total. Out of these, 35,000 were digital downloads. This was TobyMac's first No. 1 and only the third Christian album to open at that position. It also was No. 1 on the Christian Albums charts. According to Billboard, this was the first time a Christian album opened in the top spot on the 200 chart since LeAnn Rimes' You Light Up My Life: Inspirational Songs in 1997. The album beat out the hip-hop group Slaughterhouse's album Welcome to: Our House. In its second week of release, the album fell to No. 8 selling 26,000 copies, bringing the total to 95,000 copies.  The album has sold 266,000 copies in the US as of June 2015.

Track listing

Personnel 

 Toby McKeehan – lead vocals, background vocals
 Truett McKeehan - lead vocal in "Mac Daddy"
 Christopher Stevens – keys, programming, drums, guitars, background vocals
 David Garcia – guitars, keys, programming, bass, drums, background vocals
 Jamie Moore – keys, programming, piano, string arrangement, background vocals
 Trevor Morgan – guitars
 Tony Lucido – bass
 Paul Mabury – drums
 Byron "Mr. Talkbox" Chambers – talkbox
 Tim Rosenau – guitars
 Jesse Frasure – keys, programming
 Mike Woods – guitars, background vocals
 Brian Haley – drums
 Courtland Clement – guitars
 Lecrae – vocals, background vocals on "Forgiveness"
 Britt Nicole – vocals, background vocals on "Eye on It"
 Jamie Grace – vocals, background vocals on "Favorite Song"
 Blanca Callahan – vocals, background vocals on "Unstoppable"
 Kim Flemming – background vocals
 Jason Eskridge – background vocals
 Nirva Ready – background vocals
 Nancy Stevens – background vocals
 Gabe Patillo – background vocals
 Cameron Stevens – background vocals
 Vicki Hampton – background vocals

Charts

Weekly charts

Year-end charts

Decade-end charts

Certifications

References

External links 
 TobyMac discusses Eye On It

ForeFront Records albums
TobyMac albums
2012 albums
Grammy Award for Best Contemporary Christian Music Album
Christian electronic dance music albums